This is a list of films primarily marketed to children.



Pre-1940

 The Blue Bird (1918)
 Pollyanna (1920)
 Peter Pan (1924)
 A Kiss for Cinderella (1925)
 Wizard of Oz (1925)
 The Adventures of Prince Achmed (1926)
 Alice in Wonderland (1933)
 Babes in Toyland (1934)
 The New Gulliver (1935)
 The Littlest Rebel (1935)
 Little Lord Fauntleroy (1936)
 Heidi (1937)
 Wee Willie Winkie (1937)
 Snow White and the Seven Dwarfs (1937)
 The Tale of the Fox (1937)
 The Adventures of Tom Sawyer (1938)
 Alarm (1938)
 Rebecca of Sunnybrook Farm (1938)
 Gulliver's Travels (1939)
 The Little Princess (1939)
 The Wizard of Oz (1939)

1940s

1940
 The Blue Bird
 Pinocchio
 The Thief of Bagdad
1941
 Dumbo
 Mr. Bug Goes to Town
1942
 Bambi
 The Jungle Book
 Saludos Amigos
1943
 Lassie Come Home
 My Friend Flicka
1944
 National Velvet
1945
 The Enchanted Forest
 Son of Lassie
1946
 Courage of Lassie
 Song of the South
 The Yearling
1947
 Bush Christmas
 Fun and Fancy Free
1948
 The Boy with Green Hair
 Hills of Home
 So Dear to My Heart
1949
 Alice in Wonderland
 Challenge to Lassie
 The Secret Garden
 The Sun Comes Up

1950s

1950
 Cinderella
 The Great Rupert
 Heart of Stone
 Kim
 Treasure Island
1951
 Alice in Wonderland
 Amazon Symphony
 The Painted Hills
 Superman and the Mole Men
1952
 Aladdin and His Lamp
 Hans Christian Andersen
 Jack and the Beanstalk
 The Story of Robin Hood and His Merrie Men
1953
 The 5,000 Fingers of Dr. T.
 Confidentially Connie
 Little Fugitive
 Peter Pan
 Rob Roy: The Highland Rogue
 The Sword and the Rose
 White Mane
1954
 20,000 Leagues Under the Sea
 Hansel and Gretel (directed by Fritz Genschow)
 Hansel and Gretel (directed by Walter Janssen)
 Mother Holly
 Return to Treasure Island
1955
 The Court Jester
 Davy Crockett, King of the Wild Frontier
 John and Julie
 Lady and the Tramp
 The Littlest Outlaw
 A Man Called Peter
 The Stolen Airliner
1956
 The Brave One
 Davy Crockett and the River Pirates
 The Red Balloon
1957
 Johnny Tremain
 Old Yeller
 The Snow Queen
1958
 Panda and the Magic Serpent
 The 7th Voyage of Sinbad
 The Light in the Forest
 Tonka
1959
 1001 Arabian Nights
 Darby O'Gill and the Little People
 A Dog of Flanders
 Magic Boy
 Santa Claus
 The Shaggy Dog
 Sleeping Beauty

1960s

1960
 The Adventures of Huckleberry Finn
 Alakazam the Great
 The Boy and the Pirates
 David and Goliath
 The Hound That Thought He Was a Raccoon
 Hand in Hand
 Kidnapped
 Pollyanna
 Swiss Family Robinson
 Ten Who Dared
 Those Calloways
 Toby Tyler
1961
 The Absent-Minded Professor
 Babes in Toyland
 Boy Who Caught a Crook
 Greyfriars Bobby
 The Legend of Lobo
 Misty
 Mysterious Island
 Nikki, Wild Dog of the North
 One Hundred and One Dalmatians
 The Parent Trap
 Snow White and the Three Stooges
 Tomboy and the Champ
1962
 Big Red
 Gay Purr-ee
 In Search of the Castaways
 Jack the Giant Killer
 Little Red Riding Hood and Tom Thumb vs. the Monsters
 The Magic Sword
 The Two Who Stole the Moon
 The Wonderful World of the Brothers Grimm
1963
 Captain Sindbad
 The Courtship of Eddie's Father
 Flipper
 The Incredible Journey
 Jason and the Argonauts
 Lassie's Great Adventure
 Miracle of the White Stallions
 Savage Sam
 Son of Flubber
 Spencer's Mountain
 Summer Magic
 The Sword in the Stone
 The Three Lives of Thomasina
 When the Cat Comes
1964
 Dear Heart
 Emil and the Detectives
 Flipper's New Adventure
 Hey There, It's Yogi Bear!
 Island of the Blue Dolphins
 Mary Poppins
 The Misadventures of Merlin Jones
 The Moon-Spinners
 The Three Lives of Thomasina
 A Tiger Walks
1965
 Clarence, the Cross-Eyed Lion
 Funny Things Happen Down Under
 Gulliver's Travels Beyond the Moon
 Lemon Grove Kids Meet the Monsters
 The Magic World of Topo Gigio
 The Man from Button Willow
 That Darn Cat!
 Those Calloways
 Willy McBean and His Magic Machine
 Zebra in the Kitchen
1966
 The Christmas That Almost Wasn't
 The Daydreamer
 The Fighting Prince of Donegal
 Follow Me, Boys!
 The Great St. Trinian's Train Robbery
 Jimmy, the Boy Wonder
 The Magic Serpent
 The Man Called Flintstone
 Namu, the Killer Whale
 Thunderbirds Are Go
 The Ugly Dachshund
1967
 The Adventures of Bullwhip Griffin
 Brighty of the Grand Canyon
 Charlie, the Lonesome Cougar
 Doctor Dolittle
 The Gnome Mobile
 The Happiest Millionaire
 The Heathens of Kummerow
 Jack and the Beanstalk
 The Jungle Book
 Monkeys, Go Home!
 The Wacky World of Mother Goose
1968
 Asterix and Cleopatra
 Blackbeard's Ghost
 Chitty Chitty Bang Bang
 The Great Adventure of Horus, Prince of the Sun
 Heidi
 The Horse in the Gray Flannel Suit
 The Love Bug
 Never a Dull Moment
 Oliver!
 The One and Only, Genuine, Original Family Band
 Robby
 Thunderbird 6
 The World of Hans Christian Andersen
1969
 The Adventures of Goopy and Bagha
 A Boy Named Charlie Brown
 Captain Nemo and the Underwater City
 The Computer Wore Tennis Shoes
 Godzilla's Revenge
 Kes
 My Side of the Mountain
 Pippi Goes on Board
 Pippi Longstocking
 Rascal
 Run Wild, Run Free
 Tintin and the Temple of the Sun
 The Wonderful World of Puss 'n Boots

1970s

1970
 Aladdin and His Magic Lamp
 The Aristocats
 King of the Grizzlies
 The Phantom Tollbooth
 Pippi in the South Seas
 Pippi on the Run
 Pufnstuf
 The Railway Children
 Santa and the Three Bears
 The Wild Country
1971
 The Barefoot Executive
 Bedknobs and Broomsticks
 Black Beauty
 A Christmas Carol
 Flight of the Doves
 Here Comes Peter Cottontail
 The Million Dollar Duck
 The Point!
 Scandalous John
 Tales of Beatrix Potter
 Willy Wonka & the Chocolate Factory
1972
 The Amazing Mr. Blunden
 The Biscuit Eater
 Hide and Seek
 Justin Morgan Had a Horse
 Napoleon and Samantha
 Now You See Him, Now You Don't
 Oliver and the Artful Dodger
 Santa and the Ice Cream Bunny
 Snoopy, Come Home
 Snowball Express
 Sounder
 Veronica
1973
 Charley and the Angel
 Charlotte's Web
 Digby, the Biggest Dog in the World
 From the Mixed-Up Files of Mrs. Basil E. Frankweiler
 One Little Indian
 Robin Hood
 Three Wishes for Cinderella
 Tom Sawyer
 The World's Greatest Athlete
1974
 Benji
 Castaway Cowboy
 The Golden Fortress
 Herbie Rides Again
 The Island at the Top of the World
 Jack and the Beanstalk
 Journey Back to Oz
 The Little Prince
 Professor Popper's Problem
 Swallows and Amazons
 Where the Lilies Bloom
 Where the Red Fern Grows
 Winnie the Pooh and Tigger Too
1975
 Against a Crooked Sky
 The Adventures of the Wilderness Family
 The Apple Dumpling Gang
 Escape to Witch Mountain
 Hans Christian Andersen’s The Little Mermaid
 One of Our Dinosaurs Is Missing
 The Pinchcliffe Grand Prix
 Ride a Wild Pony
 The Strongest Man in the World
 Tubby the Tuba
1976
 Across the Great Divide
 Bugsy Malone
 Escape from the Dark
 Gus
 Let the Balloon Go
 No Deposit, No Return
 The Shaggy D.A.
 The Slipper and the Rose
 The Smurfs and the Magic Flute
 Storm Boy
 Treasure of Matecumbe
 The Twelve Tasks of Asterix
1977
 The Billion Dollar Hobo
 Blue Fire Lady
 Candleshoe
 Dot and the Kangaroo
 For the Love of Benji
 The Glitterball
 Gulliver's Travels
 Herbie Goes to Monte Carlo
 The Hobbit
 The Many Adventures of Winnie the Pooh
 The Mouse and His Child
 Pete's Dragon
 The Prince and the Pauper
 Race for Your Life, Charlie Brown
 Raggedy Ann & Andy: A Musical Adventure
 The Rescuers
 Return to Boggy Creek
 Wombling Free
1978
 Blue Fin
 Candleshoe
 Casey's Shadow
 The Cat from Outer Space
 The Further Adventures of the Wilderness Family
 Hot Lead and Cold Feet
 International Velvet
 The Magic of Lassie
 Return From Witch Mountain
 Ringing Bell
 Sammy's Super T-Shirt
 The Sea Gypsies
 The Water Babies
1979
 The Adventure of Sudsakorn
 The Black Stallion
 The Bugs Bunny/Road Runner Movie
 C.H.O.M.P.S.
 Mountain Family Robinson
 The North Avenue Irregulars
 Scooby Goes Hollywood
 Tarka the Otter
 Taro the Dragon Boy
 Unidentified Flying Oddball

1980s

1980
 Bon Voyage, Charlie Brown (and Don't Come Back!!)
 Doraemon: Nobita's Dinosaur
 Fatty Finn
 The King and the Mockingbird
 The Last Flight of Noah's Ark
 Little Lord Fauntleroy
 Never Never Land
 The Return of the King: A Story of the Hobbits
 Yogi's First Christmas
1981
 Doraemon: The Records of Nobita, Spaceblazer
 The Fox and the Hound
 The Little Fox
 The Looney Looney Looney Bugs Bunny Movie
 The Mystery of the Third Planet
 Revenge of the Mysterons from Mars
 Swan Lake
 Unico
1982
 Aladdin and the Magic Lamp
 Bugs Bunny's 3rd Movie: 1001 Rabbit Tales
 Doraemon: Nobita and the Haunts of Evil
 The Flight of Dragons
 Friend or Foe
 Heidi's Song
 The Last Unicorn
 Mighty Mouse in the Great Space Chase
 Oliver Twist
 The Secret of NIMH
 The Wizard of Oz (anime version)
1983
 The Black Stallion Returns
 Coolie
 Daffy Duck's Fantastic Island
 Doraemon: Nobita and the Castle of the Undersea Devil
 Dot and the Bunny
 Phar Lap
 Twice Upon a Time
 The Wind in the Willows
 Where the Toys Come From
1984
 Caravan of Courage: An Ewok Adventure
 Doraemon: Nobita's Great Adventure into the Underworld
 The Dog Who Stopped the War
 Gallavants
 The NeverEnding Story
 The Old Curiosity Shop
 Ronia, the Robber's Daughter
 Samson & Sally
 The Tale of Tsar Saltan
1985
 The Adventures of Mark Twain
 Asterix Versus Caesar
 The Black Cauldron
 The Care Bears Movie
 D.A.R.Y.L.
 Doraemon: Nobita's Little Star Wars
 The Dirt Bike Kid
 Give the Devil His Due
 He-Man and She-Ra: The Secret of the Sword
 Here Come the Littles
 The Peanut Butter Solution
 The Pickwick Papers
 Rainbow Brite and the Star Stealer
 Sesame Street Presents Follow That Bird
 Star Fairies

1986
 The Adventures of the American Rabbit
 The Adventures of Milo and Otis
 The Adventures of Scamper the Penguin
 An American Tail
 Babes in Toyland
 Care Bears Movie II: A New Generation
 Castle in the Sky
 Doraemon: Nobita and the Steel Troops
 Flight of the Navigator
 GoBots: Battle of the Rock Lords
 The Great Mouse Detective
 Heathcliff: The Movie
 Lightning, the White Stallion
 Momo
 My Little Pony: The Movie
 SpaceCamp
 Super Mario Bros.: The Great Mission to Rescue Princess Peach!
 The Transformers: The Movie
 Valhalla
1987
 Batteries Not Included
 Benji the Hunted
 The Brave Little Toaster
 The Care Bears Adventure in Wonderland
 The Chipmunk Adventure
 Doraemon: Nobita and the Knights on Dinosaurs
 The Garbage Pail Kids Movie
 G.I. Joe: The Movie
 The Great Land of Small
 The Jetsons Meet the Flintstones
 Mio in the Land of Faraway
 Pinocchio and the Emperor of the Night
 The Puppetoon Movie
 Scooby-Doo Meets the Boo Brothers
 The Secret Garden
 Top Cat and the Beverly Hills Cats
 Ultraman: The Adventure Begins
 Where Is the Friend's Home?
 Yogi Bear and the Magical Flight of the Spruce Goose
 Yogi's Great Escape
1988
 BraveStarr: The Movie
 Care Bears Nutcracker Suite
 Daffy Duck's Quackbusters
 David and the Magic Pearl
 Doraemon: The Record of Nobita's Parallel Visit to the West
 Felix the Cat: The Movie
 The Good, the Bad, and Huckleberry Hound
 Just Ask for Diamond
 The Land Before Time
 Mac and Me
 My Neighbor Totoro
 The New Adventures of Pippi Longstocking
 Oliver & Company
 Pound Puppies and the Legend of Big Paw
 Purple People Eater
 Rockin' with Judy Jetson
 Scooby-Doo and the Ghoul School
 Scooby-Doo! and the Reluctant Werewolf
 Willy the Sparrow
 Yogi and the Invasion of the Space Bears
1989
 The Adventures of Chatran
 All Dogs Go to Heaven
 Asterix and the Big Fight
 Babar: The Movie
 The BFG
 Cheetah
 Doraemon: Nobita and the Birth of Japan
 George's Island
 Granpa
 The Little Mermaid 
 Little Monsters
 Little Nemo: Adventures in Slumberland
 Looking for Miracles
 Prancer
 The Wizard
 Yaaba

1990s

1990
 Courage Mountain
 DuckTales the Movie: Treasure of the Lost Lamp
 The Fool of the World and the Flying Ship
 A Gnome Named Gnorm
 Home Alone
 Jetsons: The Movie
 A Mom for Christmas
 The NeverEnding Story II: The Next Chapter
 The Nutcracker Prince
 Peter in Magicland
 The Rescuers Down Under
 Shipwrecked
 The Witches
1991
 Adventures in Dinosaur City
 And You Thought Your Parents Were Weird
 An American Tail: Fievel Goes West
 Bingo
 Ernest Scared Stupid
 The Giant of Thunder Mountain
 In the Nick of Time
 Perfect Harmony
 The Princess and the Goblin
 Problem Child 2
 Rock-a-Doodle
 The Seventh Brother
1992
 3 Ninjas
 Adventures in Dinosaur City
 Aladdin
 Alan and Naomi
 Beauty and the Beast
 Beethoven
 Blinky Bill
 The Boy and the King
 FernGully: The Last Rainforest
 Freddie as F.R.O.7
 Home Alone 2: Lost in New York
 Into the West
 The Mighty Ducks
 Munchie
 Porco Rosso
 Split Infinity
 The Three Musketeers
 Tiny Toon Adventures: How I Spent My Vacation
 To Grandmother's House We Go
 Tom and Jerry: The Movie
1993
 The Adventures of Huck Finn
 Beethoven's 2nd
 Dennis the Menace
 Digger
 A Far Off Place
 Free Willy
 Happily Ever After
 Hocus Pocus
 Homeward Bound: The Incredible Journey
 Kid Cop
 Little Miss Millions
 Magic Kid
 Me and the Kid
 Mr. Nanny
 The Nutcracker
 Once Upon a Forest
 Prehysteria!
 Rigoletto
 Rookie of the Year
 Sailor Moon R: The Movie
 The Secret Garden
 The Silver Brumby
 Sinbad
 The Three Musketeers
 We're Back! A Dinosaur's Story
 Wind Dancer
1994
 3 Ninjas Kick Back
 Andre
 Angels in the Outfield
 Asterix Conquers America
 Baby's Day Out
 Black Beauty
 Blank Check
 Camp Nowhere
 Cinderella
 D2: The Mighty Ducks
 Dragonworld
 Getting Even With Dad
 Iron Will
 Jock of the Bushveld
 The Jungle Book
 The Land Before Time II: The Great Valley Adventure
 Lassie
 Leo the Lion: King of the Jungle
 The Lion King
 Little Big League
 Little Giants
 The Little Rascals
 Magic Kid 2
 Miracle on 34th Street (remake)
 Monkey Trouble
 Munchie Strikes Back
 My Girl 2
 The NeverEnding Story III
 No Worries
 The Pagemaster
 Pet Shop
 Pocahontas
 Pom Poko
 Prehysteria! 2
 The Return of Jafar
 Richie Rich
 Sailor Moon S: The Movie
 The Santa Clause
 Scooby-Doo! in Arabian Nights
 The Secret of Roan Inish
 The Shaggy Dog
 The Swan Princess
 Thumbelina
 Trading Mom
 A Troll in Central Park
 War of the Buttons
 White Fang 2: Myth of the White Wolf
1995
 3 Ninjas Knuckle Up
 The Amazing Panda Adventure
 Babe
 The Baby-Sitters Club
 Balto
 The Big Green
 Born to Be Wild
 Bushwhacked
 Casper
 Catnapped!
 Escape to Witch Mountain
 Far from Home: The Adventures of Yellow Dog
 Fluke
 Free Willy 2: The Adventure Home
 Friendship's Field
 Gargoyles the Movie: The Heroes Awaken
 Gold Diggers: The Secret of Bear Mountain
 A Goofy Movie
 Gordy
 Gumby: The Movie
 Heavyweights
 Heidi
 Here Come the Munsters
 The Indian in the Cupboard
 It Takes Two
 Jonny Quest vs. The Cyber Insects
 Jumanji
 A Kid in King Arthur's Court
 The Land Before Time III: The Time of the Great Giving
 A Little Princess
 Little Red Riding Hood
 Magic Island
 Magic in the Water
 Man of the House
 Mighty Morphin Power Rangers: The Movie
 Monster Mash
 Napoleon
 The Pebble and the Penguin
 Pocahontas
 Sailor Moon Super S: The Movie
 The Tale of Tillie's Dragon
 Three Wishes
 Toy Story
 The White Balloon
 The Wind in the Willows
1996
 101 Dalmatians
 The Adventures of Pinocchio
 Aladdin and the King of Thieves
 Alaska
 All Dogs Go to Heaven 2
 Body Troopers
 Bogus
 Clubhouse Detectives
 D3: The Mighty Ducks
 Dunston Checks In
 Ed
 First Kid
 Flipper
 Forest Warrior
 Harriet the Spy
 Homeward Bound II: Lost in San Francisco
 How the Toys Saved Christmas
 James and the Giant Peach
 Kazaam
 The Land Before Time IV: Journey Through the Mists
 The Last Home Run
 Matilda
 My Friend Joe
 The Paper Brigade
 Rainbow
 Sabrina the Teenage Witch
 Santa With Muscles
 Shiloh
 Space Jam
 Susie Q
 The Wind in the Willows
 Wish Upon a Star
1997
 Air Bud
 Anastasia
 Angels in the Endzone
 Beauty and the Beast: The Enchanted Christmas
 The Borrowers
 The Brave Little Toaster to the Rescue
 Buddy
 Casper: A Spirited Beginning
 Cats Don't Dance
 A Christmas Carol
 Cinderella
 FairyTale: A True Story
 The Fearless Four
 Free Willy 3: The Rescue
 George of the Jungle
 Good Burger
 Hercules
 Home Alone 3
 The Land Before Time V: The Mysterious Island
 MouseHunt
 Mr. Magoo
 Northern Lights
 Oliver Twist
 Paws
 Pippi Longstocking
 Pooh's Grand Adventure: The Search for Christopher Robin
 RocketMan
 The Second Jungle Book: Mowgli & Baloo
 A Simple Wish
 The Swan Princess II: Escape from Castle Mountain
 That Darn Cat
 Turbo: A Power Rangers Movie
 Under Wraps
 Warriors of Virtue
 The Wiggles Movie
 Zeus and Roxanne
1998
 3 Ninjas: High Noon at Mega Mountain
 Air Bud: Golden Receiver
 An All Dogs Christmas Carol
 An American Tail: The Treasure of Manhattan Island
 Antz
 Babe: Pig in the City
 Baby Huey's Great Easter Adventure
 Barney's Great Adventure
 Beauty and the Beast: Belle's Magical World
 Billboard Dad
 The Brave Little Toaster Goes to Mars
 A Bug's Life
 Casper Meets Wendy
 Dennis the Menace Strikes Again
 FernGully 2: The Magical Rescue
 The First Snow of Winter
 Halloweentown
 Hercules and Xena – The Animated Movie: The Battle for Mount Olympus
 Hercules: Zero to Hero
 I'll Be Home for Christmas
 Jack Frost
 The Land Before Time VI: The Secret of Saurus Rock
 The Lion King II: Simba's Pride
 Madeline
 Meet the Deedles
 The Mighty Kong
 Mulan
 My Date with the President's Daughter
 Noah
 The Parent Trap
 Paulie
 Pocahontas II: Journey to a New World
 Pokémon: The First Movie
 The Prince of Egypt
 Quest for Camelot
 Rudolph the Red-Nosed Reindeer: The Movie
 The Rugrats Movie
 Rusty: A Dog's Tale
 Safety Patrol
 Scooby-Doo on Zombie Island
 The Secret of NIMH 2: Timmy to the Rescue
 Slappy and the Stinkers
 Star Kid
 Summer of the Monkeys
 The Swan Princess: The Mystery of the Enchanted Kingdom
 Wide Awake
 The Wonderful Ice Cream Suit
 You Lucky Dog
1999
 The Adventures of Elmo in Grouchland
 Alvin and the Chipmunks Meet Frankenstein
 Animal Farm
 Annie
 Babar: King of the Elephants
 Bartok the Magnificent
 Belle's Tales of Friendship
 Can of Worms
 Cardcaptor Sakura: The Movie
 Dillagi
 A Dog of Flanders
 Don't Look Under the Bed
 Doug's 1st Movie
 Durango Kids
 Faeries (1999 film)
 Genius
 Horse Sense
 I'll Remember April
 Inspector Gadget
 The Iron Giant
 Johnny Tsunami
 The King and I
 Liang Po Po: The Movie
 Madeline: Lost in Paris
 My Brother the Pig
 The New Adventures of Pinocchio
 Nico the Unicorn
 The Nuttiest Nutcracker
 Passport to Paris
 Peppermint
 Pirates of the Plain
 Pokémon: The Movie 2000
 The Prince and the Surfer
 Running Free
 Scooby-Doo! and the Witch's Ghost
 Secret of the Andes
 Shiloh 2: Shiloh Season
 Smart House
 Stuart Little
 Switching Goals
 Tarzan
 The Thirteenth Year
 Tom's Midnight Garden
 Toy Story 2
 Wakko's Wish
 Yu-Gi-Oh!
 Zenon: Girl of the 21st Century

2000s

2000
 102 Dalmatians
 Air Bud: World Pup
 Alvin and the Chipmunks Meet the Wolfman
 Beethoven's 3rd
 Blue's Big Musical Movie
 Can't Be Heaven
 Cardcaptor Sakura Movie 2: The Sealed Card
 Casper's Haunted Christmas
 Chicken Run
 The Color of Friendship
 Digimon: The Movie
 Dinosaur
 Dr. Seuss' How the Grinch Stole Christmas
 The Emperor's New Groove
 Escape to Grizzly Mountain
 An Extremely Goofy Movie
 The Flintstones in Viva Rock Vegas
 Franklin and the Green Knight
 Grandma Got Run Over by a Reindeer
 Help! I'm a Fish
 Joseph: King of Dreams
 The Land Before Time VII: The Stone of Cold Fire
 The Life & Adventures of Santa Claus
 Life-Size
 The Little Mermaid II: Return to the Sea
 The Little Vampire
 Mermaid
 Miracle in Lane 2
 Mom's Got a Date with a Vampire
 Monster Mash
 My Dog Skip
 Once Upon a Christmas
 The Other Me
 Our Lips Are Sealed
 Phantom of the Megaplex
 Pokémon 3: The Movie
 Pokémon: Mewtwo Returns
 Quints
 Ready to Run
 The Road to El Dorado
 Rugrats in Paris: The Movie
 Running Free
 The Scarecrow
 Scooby-Doo and the Alien Invaders
 Seventeen Again
 Stepsister from Planet Weird
 A Summer Tale
 The Tangerine Bear
 Thomas and the Magic Railroad
 The Tigger Movie
 Titan A.E.
 Tom Sawyer
 Tweety's High Flying Adventure
 Up, Up and Away
2001
 Atlantis: The Lost Empire
 Back to the Secret Garden
 Barbie in the Nutcracker
 Beethoven's 4th
 The Book of Pooh: Stories from the Heart
 Cats & Dogs
 Dr. Dolittle 2
 The Flintstones: On the Rocks
 Franklin's Magic Christmas
 Halloweentown II: Kalabar's Revenge
 The Happy Cricket
 Harry Potter and the Philosopher's Stone
 Holiday in the Sun
 Hounded
 The Jar: A Tale from the East
 The Jennie Project
 Jimmy Neutron: Boy Genius
 Jumping Ship
 Kingdom Come
 Lady and the Tramp II: Scamp's Adventure
 The Land Before Time VIII: The Big Freeze
 The Little Bear Movie
 The Luck of the Irish
 Marco Polo: Return to Xanadu
 Max Keeble's Big Move
 Monsters, Inc.
 Motocrossed
 MVP: Most Vertical Primate
 My Life as McDull
 Osmosis Jones
 Pokémon 4Ever
 The Poof Point
 Recess: School's Out
 Rugrats: All Growed Up
 Scooby-Doo and the Cyber Chase
 See Spot Run
 Shrek
 Spirited Away
 Spy Kids
 The Trumpet of the Swan
 'Twas the Night
 Voyage of the Unicorn
 Winning London
2002
 The Adventures of Tom Thumb and Thumbelina
 The Archies in Jugman
 Asterix and Obelix: Mission Cleopatra
 Balto II: Wolf Quest
 Barbie as Rapunzel
 Big Fat Liar
 Carol's Journey
 Catch That Girl
 The Cat Returns
 Cinderella II: Dreams Come True
 The Climb
 Clockstoppers
 The Country Bears
 Dennis the Menace: Cruise Control
 Dibu 3
 Double Teamed
 Elina: As If I Wasn't There
 Falling Sky
 Get a Clue
 Getting There
 Gotta Kick It Up!
 Grand Champion
 Groove Squad
 Harry Potter and the Chamber of Secrets
 Hey Arnold!: The Movie
 Home Alone 4
 The Hunchback of Notre Dame II
 Ice Age
 Jonah: A VeggieTales Movie
 Kermit's Swamp Years
 The Land Before Time IX: Journey to Big Water
 Like Mike
 Lilo & Stitch
 Pinocchio
 Pokémon Heroes
 The Powerpuff Girls Movie
 The Princess and the Pea
 Return to Never Land
 A Ring of Endless Light
 The Rookie
 Sabrina: Friends Forever
 The Santa Clause 2
 Scooby-Doo
 The Scream Team
 Snow Dogs
 Spirit: Stallion of the Cimarron
 Spy Kids 2: The Island of Lost Dreams
 Stuart Little 2
 Tarzan & Jane
 Thunderpants
 Tom and Jerry: The Magic Ring
 Tom and Thomas
 Treasure Planet
 Tru Confessions
 Tuck Everlasting
 Virginia's Run
 Whale Rider
 When in Rome
 The Wild Thornberrys Movie
2003
 101 Dalmatians II: Patch's London Adventure
 Agent Cody Banks
 Air Bud: Spikes Back
 Atlantis: Milo's Return
 Barbie of Swan Lake
 Batman: Mystery of the Batwoman
 Beethoven's 5th
 Blizzard
 Brother Bear
 Caillou's Holiday Movie
 Captain Sabertooth
 Charlotte's Web 2: Wilbur's Great Adventure
 The Cat in the Hat
 The Challenge
 Eddie's Million Dollar Cook-Off
 Finding Nemo
 The Flying Classroom
 Freaky Friday
 Full-Court Miracle
 The Ghost Club
 Good Boy!
 The Haunted Mansion
 Holes
 Hot Wheels World Race
 I, Cesar
 The Jungle Book 2
 Just for Kicks
 Kangaroo Jack
 Kim Possible Movie: A Sitch in Time
 The Land Before Time X: The Great Longneck Migration
 The Legend of Johnny Lingo
 A Light in the Forest
 Maniac Magee
 Miss Spider's Sunny Patch Kids
 Peter Pan
 Piglet's Big Movie
 Pokémon: Jirachi Wish Maker
 Quigley
 Recess: All Growed Down
 Recess: Taking the Fifth Grade
 Rescue Heroes: The Movie
 Right on Track
 Rugrats Go Wild
 Scooby-Doo! and the Legend of the Vampire
 Scooby-Doo! and the Monster of Mexico
 Secondhand Lions
 Sinbad: Legend of the Seven Seas
 Spy Kids 3-D: Game Over
 Stitch! The Movie
 The Story of the Weeping Camel
 What a Girl Wants
 When Zachary Beaver Came to Town
 Wondrous Oblivion
 The Wooden Camera
 You Wish!
 Young Black Stallion
2004
 Agent Cody Banks 2: Destination London
 Around the World in 80 Days
 Barbie as the Princess and the Pauper
 Care Bears: Journey to Joke-a-lot
 Catch That Kid
 Chestnut: Hero of Central Park
 Clifford's Really Big Movie
 Confessions of a Teenage Drama Queen
 The Dust Factory
 Ella Enchanted
 Fat Albert
 Funky Monkey
 Garfield: The Movie
 Going to the Mat
 Harry Potter and the Prisoner of Azkaban
 Home on the Range
 Howl's Moving Castle
 The Incredibles
 In Orange
 In Search of Santa
 Kangaroo Jack: G'Day U.S.A.!
 Lemony Snicket's A Series of Unfortunate Events
 The Lion King 1½
 Mickey's Twice Upon a Christmas
 Mulan II
 My Scene: Jammin' in Jamaica
 New York Minute
 Pinocchio 3000
 Pokémon: Destiny Deoxys
 The Polar Express
 The Princess Diaries 2: Royal Engagement
 Raise Your Voice
 Scooby-Doo! and the Loch Ness Monster
 Scooby-Doo 2: Monsters Unleashed
 Shark Tale
 Shrek 2
 Sleepover
 The SpongeBob SquarePants Movie
 Spookley the Square Pumpkin
 The Story of an African Farm
 Stuck in the Suburbs
 Tainá 2: A New Amazon Adventure
 Teacher's Pet
 Thunderbirds
 Two Brothers
 The Winning Season
 Yu-Gi-Oh! The Movie: Pyramid of Light
 Zenon: Z3
2005
 The Adventures of Sharkboy and Lavagirl in 3-D
 Aloha, Scooby-Doo!
 Arashi no Yoru ni
 Are We There Yet?
 Balto III: Wings of Change
 Bailey's Billion$
 Barbie and the Magic of Pegasus
 Barbie: Fairytopia
 The Batman vs. Dracula
 Because of Winn-Dixie
 The Blue Umbrella
 Bob the Butler
 Buffalo Dreams
 Calling All Engines
 Candy Land: The Great Lollipop Adventure
 The Care Bears' Big Wish Movie
 Charlie and the Chocolate Factory
 Cheaper by the Dozen 2
 Chicken Little
 The Chronicles of Narnia: The Lion, the Witch and the Wardrobe
 Come Away Home
 Digital Monster X-Evolution
 Dinotopia: Quest for the Ruby Sunstone
 Down and Derby
 Duma
 Empress Chung
 The Golden Blaze
 The Great Yokai War
 The Happy Elf
 Harry Potter and the Goblet of Fire
 Heidi
 Hoodwinked!
 Hot Wheels AcceleRacers
 Kicking and Screaming
 Ice Princess
 Kim Possible Movie: So the Drama
 The Land Before Time XI: Invasion of the Tinysauruses
 Lassie
 Life Is Ruff
 Little Manhattan
 Madagascar
 The Magic Roundabout
 My Little Pony: A Very Minty Christmas
 My Scene Goes Hollywood
 Nanny McPhee
 Once Upon a Halloween
 Pokémon: Lucario and the Mystery of Mew
 Pooh's Heffalump Halloween Movie
 Pooh's Heffalump Movie
 Popstar
 The Proud Family Movie
 Racing Stripes
 Rebound
 Robots
 School's Out!: The Musical
 Scooby-Doo! in Where's My Mummy?
 Sky High
 Son of the Mask
 Stuart Little 3: Call of the Wild
 Tarzan II
 Tom and Jerry: Blast Off to Mars
 Tom and Jerry: The Fast and the Furry
 Valiant
 Wallace & Gromit: The Curse of the Were-Rabbit
 Zathura: A Space Adventure
2006
 The Adventures of Brer Rabbit
 Air Buddies
 Akeelah and the Bee
 The Ant Bully
 Aquamarine
 Arthur and the Invisibles
 Azur and Asmar
 Bambi II
 The Barbie Diaries
 Barbie in the 12 Dancing Princesses
 Barbie: Mermaidia
 Barnyard
 The Blue Elephant
 Bratz Genie Magic
 Brother Bear 2
 Cars
 Casper's Scare School
 Charlotte's Web
 A Christmas Carol
 Codename: Kids Next Door: Operation: Z.E.R.O
 Curious George
 Deck the Halls
 Dr. Dolittle 3
 Eragon
 Everyone's Hero
 Eye of the Dolphin
 Flicka
 Flushed Away
 The Fox and the Hound 2
 Franklin and the Turtle Lake Treasure
 Garfield: A Tail of Two Kitties
 Happy Feet
 Hearty Paws
 High School Musical
 Holly Hobbie and Friends: Christmas Wishes
 Holly Hobbie and Friends: Surprise Party
 Hoot
 How to Eat Fried Worms
 Ice Age: The Meltdown
 The Land Before Time XII: The Great Day of the Flyers
 The Legend of Sasquatch
 Leroy & Stitch
 Lotte from Gadgetville
 Miss Potter
 Monster House
 A Movie of Eggs
 My Little Pony Crystal Princess: The Runaway Rainbow
 My Little Pony: The Princess Promenade
 Open Season
 Over the Hedge
 Pokémon: The Mastermind of Mirage Pokémon
 Pokémon Ranger and the Temple of the Sea
 PollyWorld
 The Prince and Me 2: The Royal Wedding
 Re-Animated
 Return To Halloweentown
 The Santa Clause 3: The Escape Clause
 Saving Shiloh
 Scooby-Doo! Pirates Ahoy!
 The Shaggy Dog
 Shark Bait
 Stanley's Dinosaur Round-Up
 Stormbreaker
 Strawberry Shortcake: The Sweet Dreams Movie
 Teen Titans: Trouble in Tokyo
 The Thief Lord
 Tom and Jerry: Shiver Me Whiskers
 The Ugly Duckling and Me!
 Unaccompanied Minors
 The Wild
 Zoom
2007
 Alice Upside Down
 Alvin and the Chipmunks
 Arctic Tale
 Barbie as the Island Princess
 Battle for Terra
 Bratz Kidz: Sleep-Over Adventure
 Brichos
 Bridge to Terabithia
 Care Bears: Oopsy Does It!
 Chill Out, Scooby-Doo!
 Christmas Is Here Again
 Cinderella III: A Twist in Time
 Daddy Day Camp
 Donkey Xote
 Fairly OddBaby
 Finding Rin Tin Tin
 Firehouse Dog
 Fishtales
 Flight of the Red Balloon
 The Fox and the Child
 The Game Plan
 Garfield Gets Real
 The Great Discovery
 Happily N'Ever After
 Johnny Kapahala: Back on Board
 Labou
 The Land Before Time XIII: The Wisdom of Friends
 Like Stars on Earth
 Meet the Robinsons
 Mug Travel
 My Friends Tigger & Pooh: Super Sleuth Christmas Movie
 My Little Pony: A Very Pony Place
 Nancy Drew
 Nocturna
 Pokémon: The Rise of Darkrai
 Pride
 Ratatouille
 The Secret of the Magic Gourd
 Shrek the Third
 SpongeBob's Atlantis SquarePantis
 Stardust
 Strawberry Shortcake: Berry Blossom Festival
 Strawberry Shortcake: Let's Dance
 Surf's Up
 The Ten Commandments
 TMNT
 Tom and Jerry: A Nutcracker Tale
 Underdog
 The Water Horse: Legend of the Deep
 Winx Club: The Secret of the Lost Kingdom
2008
 All Roads Lead Home
 Asterix at the Olympic Games
 Barbie & the Diamond Castle
 Barbie Mariposa
 Bedtime Stories
 Beethoven's Big Break
 Beverly Hills Chihuahua
 Bolt 
 The Chronicles of Narnia: Prince Caspian
 College Road Trip
 Dr. Dolittle: Tail to the Chief
 Delgo
 Dragon Hunters
 The Flight Before Christmas
 Fly Me to the Moon
 Garfield's Fun Fest
 The Great Discovery
 Hari Puttar: A Comedy of Terrors
 Horton Hears a Who!
 Igor
 Impy's Island
 Inkheart
 Kit Kittredge: An American Girl
 Kung Fu Panda
 Lost Stallions: The Journey Home
 Madagascar: Escape 2 Africa
 Merry Christmas, Drake & Josh
 Minutemen
 Missing Lynx
 Nim's Island
 Open Season 2
 The Pirates Who Don't Do Anything: A VeggieTales Movie
 Pokémon: Giratina and the Sky Warrior
 Ponyo
 Roadside Romeo 
 Roxy Hunter and the Secret of the Shaman
 The Seven of Daran: Battle of Pareo Rock
 Scooby-Doo! and the Goblin King
 The Secret of Moonacre
 Snow Buddies
 Space Chimps
 The Spiderwick Chronicles
 Spirit of the Forest
 Spy School
 Strawberry Shortcake: Rockaberry Roll
 Summer of the Flying Saucer
 The Tale of Despereaux
 Tinker Bell
 WALL-E
 Wubbzy's Big Movie!
2009
 Aliens in the Attic
 Alvin and the Chipmunks: The Squeakquel
 An American Girl: Chrissa Stands Strong
 Another Egg and Chicken Movie
 Arthur and the Revenge of Maltazard
 Astro Boy
 Barbie and the Three Musketeers
 Barbie Thumbelina
 Ben 10: Alien Swarm
 Broken Hill
 Chal Chalein
 Cloudy With a Chance of Meatballs
 Coraline
 Curious George 2: Follow That Monkey!
 Dr. Dolittle: Million Dollar Mutts
 Ed, Edd n Eddy's Big Picture Show
 Fantastic Mr. Fox
 G-Force
 Gooby
 The Gruffalo
 Hachi: A Dog's Tale
 Hannah Montana: The Movie
 Happily N'Ever After 2: Snow White Another Bite @ the Apple
 The Happy Cricket and the Giant Bugs
 Hatching Pete
 Harry Potter and the Half-Blood Prince
 Hero of the Rails
 Hotel for Dogs
 Ice Age: Dawn of the Dinosaurs
 Inkheart
 Just Peck
 Looking for Jackie
 Monsters vs. Aliens
 My Little Pony: Twinkle Wish Adventure
 The Perfect Game
 Planet 51
 Pokémon: Arceus and the Jewel of Life
 The Princess and the Frog
 Professor Layton and the Eternal Diva
 Race to Witch Mountain
 Scooby-Doo! and the Samurai Sword
 Scooby-Doo! The Mystery Begins
 The Secret of Kells
 The Secret of Moonacre
 A Shine of Rainbows
 Shorts
 Space Buddies
 The Strawberry Shortcake Movie: Sky's the Limit
 Tinker Bell and the Lost Treasure
 Totally Spies! The Movie
 Turtles Forever
 Up
 Vicky the Viking
 Where the Wild Things Are
 The Wild Stallion
 Wishology
 Wow! Wow! Wubbzy!: Wubb Idol

2010s

2010
 Adventures of a Teenage Dragon Slayer
 Alpha and Omega
 ...And Once Again
 Animals United
 Arrietty
 Arthur 3: The War of the Two Worlds
 Barbie: A Fashion Fairytale
 Barbie in A Mermaid Tale
 Big Time Christmas
 Big Time Concert
 The Black Tulip
 The Boy Who Cried Werewolf
 Care Bears: The Giving Festival
 Care Bears: Share Bear Shines
 A Cat in Paris
 Cats & Dogs: The Revenge of Kitty Galore
 The Chronicles of Narnia: The Voyage of the Dawn Treader
 Despicable Me
 Diary of a Wimpy Kid
 The Dog Who Saved Christmas Vacation
 Elle: A Modern Cinderella Tale
 Expecting Mary
 Firebreather
 Flicka 2
 Flipped
 Free Willy: Escape from Pirate's Cove
 Furry Vengeance
 Gaturro
 Gulliver's Travels
 Harriet the Spy: Blog Wars
 Harry Potter and the Deathly Hallows – Part 1
 How to Train Your Dragon
 Kooky
 Kung Fu Magoo
 Kung Fu Panda Holiday
 The Last Airbender
 Legend of the Guardians: The Owls of Ga'Hoole
 The Legend of Silk Boy
 Lego: The Adventures of Clutch Powers
 Marmaduke
 Mayor Cupcake
 Megamind
 My Friends Tigger & Pooh: Super Duper Super Sleuths
 Nanny McPhee and the Big Bang
 Open Season 3
 Percy Jackson & the Olympians: The Lightning Thief	
 Plumíferos
 Pokémon: Zoroark: Master of Illusions
 Ramona and Beezus
 Scooby-Doo! Abracadabra-Doo
 Scooby-Doo! Camp Scare
 Scooby-Doo! Curse of the Lake Monster
 The Search for Santa Paws
 Shrek Forever After
 Space Chimps 2: Zartog Strikes Back
 Space Dogs
 Tangled
 Tinker Bell and the Great Fairy Rescue
 Tom and Jerry Meet Sherlock Holmes
 Tooth Fairy
 Toy Story 3
 A Turtle's Tale: Sammy's Adventures
 Welcome to the Space Show
 What If...
 Winx Club 3D: Magical Adventure
 Yogi Bear
 Yu-Gi-Oh!: Bonds Beyond Time
2011

 After the Wizard
 Alvin and the Chipmunks: Chipwrecked
 Arthur Christmas
 Barbie: A Fairy Secret
 Barbie: Princess Charm School
 Beethoven's Christmas Adventure
 Best Player
 Beverly Hills Chihuahua 2
 Big Time Beach Party
 Brasil Animado
 Cars 2
 Chillar Party
 Dolphin Tale
 Diary of a Wimpy Kid: Rodrick Rules
 The Dragon Pearl
 A Fairly Odd Movie: Grow Up, Timmy Turner!
 From Up on Poppy Hill
 Gnomeo & Juliet
 The Great Bear
 The Great Ghost Rescue
 The Gruffalo's Child
 Happy Feet Two
 Harry Potter and the Deathly Hallows – Part 2
 Hoodwinked Too! Hood vs. Evil
 Hop
 Horrid Henry: The Movie
 I Am Kalam
 Judy Moody and the Not Bummer Summer
 Koko and the Ghosts
 Kung Fu Panda 2
 The Lamp
 Leafie, A Hen Into the Wild
 Legend of a Rabbit
 Little Big Panda
 The Little Engine That Could
 The Magic of Belle Isle
 Mars Needs Moms
 Monster Mutt
 A Monster in Paris
 Monte Carlo
 Mr. Popper's Penguins
 The Muppets
 My Angel
 Once Upon a Warrior
 Phineas and Ferb the Movie: Across the 2nd Dimension
 Pixie Hollow Games
 Pokémon the Movie: Black—Victini and Reshiram and White—Victini and Zekrom
 Puss in Boots
 Quest for Zhu
 Red Dog
 Rio
 Scooby-Doo! Legend of the Phantosaur
 SeeFood
 The Smurfs
 Snowflake, the White Gorilla
 Spy Kids: All the Time in the World
 Tainá 3: The Origin
 Tibetan Dog
 Tom and Jerry and the Wizard of Oz
 Top Cat: The Movie
 Winnie the Pooh
2012

 The Adventures of Mickey Matson and the Copperhead Treasure
 Back to the Sea
 Barbie in A Mermaid Tale 2
 Barbie: The Princess & the Popstar
 Beverly Hills Chihuahua 3
 Big Top Scooby-Doo!
 Brave
 Cowgirls 'n Angels
 Diary of a Wimpy Kid: Dog Days
 Dino Time
 Echo Planet
 Ernest & Celestine
 A Fairly Odd Christmas
 Hotel Transylvania
 Ice Age: Continental Drift
 The Lorax
 Madagascar 3: Europe's Most Wanted
 The Oogieloves in the Big Balloon Adventure
 Outback
 ParaNorman
 Peixonauta – Agente Secreto da O.S.T.R.A.
 The Pirates! In an Adventure with Scientists!
 Pokémon the Movie: Kyurem vs. the Sword of Justice
 Rags
 The Reef 2: High Tide
 Room on the Broom
 Sammy's Great Escape
 Santa Paws 2: The Santa Pups
 Scooby-Doo! Music of the Vampire
 Secret of the Wings
 The Snow Queen
 The Snowman and the Snowdog
 So Undercover
 The Swan Princess Christmas
 Tad, the Lost Explorer
 Tinker Bell and the Secret of the Wings
 Thunderstruck
 Tom and Jerry: Robin Hood and His Merry Mouse
 A Turtle's Tale 2: Sammy's Escape from Paradise
 Wreck-It Ralph
 Yak: The Giant King
 Zambezia
2013

 Against the Wild
 Alpha and Omega 2: A Howl-iday Adventure
 Angels Sing
 Bunks
 Cloudy with a Chance of Meatballs 2
 Contest
 The Croods
 Despicable Me 2
 Epic
 Escape from Planet Earth
 Free Birds
 Frozen
 The House of Magic
 Jinxed
 Jungle Master
 Justin and the Knights of Valour
 Khumba
 Legends of Oz: Dorothy's Return
 Monsters University
 Moshi Monsters: The Movie
 My Little Pony: Equestria Girls
 Nicky Deuce
 Oggy and the Cockroaches: The Movie
 Percy Jackson: Sea of Monsters
 Planes
 Pokémon the Movie: Genesect and the Legend Awakened
 Pororo, The Racing Adventure
 Return to Nim's Island
 Robosapien: Rebooted
 Savannah
 Scooby-Doo! Adventures: The Mystery Map
 Scooby-Doo! Mask of the Blue Falcon
 Scooby-Doo! Stage Fright
 The Smurfs 2
 Super Buddies
 Swindle
 A Talking Cat!?!
 Thunder and the House of Magic
 Tom and Jerry's Giant Adventure
 Transformers Prime Beast Hunters: Predacons Rising
 Turbo
 Underdogs
 Walking with Dinosaurs
 Wish You Well
 Zambezia
 Zip & Zap and the Marble Gang
2014

 Alexander and the Terrible, Horrible, No Good, Very Bad Day
 Alpha and Omega 3: The Great Wolf Games
 Alpha and Omega 4: The Legend of the Saw Tooth Cave
 Asterix and Obelix: Mansion of the Gods
 Big Hero 6
 The Book of Life
 Boonie Bears: To the Rescue
 The Boxtrolls
 Dolphin Tale 2
 Dragon Nest: Warriors' Dawn
 Earth to Echo
 From Up on Poppy Hill
 The Frogville
 Henry & Me
 The Hero of Color City
 How to Steal a Dog
 How to Train Your Dragon 2
 The Incredible Adventures of Professor Branestawm
 Jungle Shuffle
 The Lego Movie
 The Monkey King
 Mr. Peabody & Sherman
 Muppets Most Wanted
 My Little Pony: Equestria Girls – Rainbow Rocks
 The Nut Job
 Paddington
 Penguins of Madagascar
 Ping Pong Summer
 The Pirate Fairy
 Planes: Fire & Rescue
 Pokémon the Movie: Diancie and the Cocoon of Destruction
 Postman Pat: The Movie
 Pudsey the Dog: The Movie
 Rio 2
 Scooby-Doo! Frankencreepy
 Scooby-Doo! WrestleMania Mystery
 Song of the Sea
 Stand by Me Doraemon
 The Swan Princess: A Royal Family Tale
 Tom and Jerry: The Lost Dragon
 Tom and Jerry: Santa's Little Helpers
2015

 Alibaba and the Thief
 Alvin and the Chipmunks: The Road Chip
 Blinky Bill the Movie
 Brave Rabbit 2 Crazy Circus
 Capture the Flag
 The Flintstones & WWE: Stone Age SmackDown!
 The Good Dinosaur
 Goosebumps
 Heidi
 Home
 Hotel Transylvania 2
 Huevos: Little Rooster's Egg-cellent Adventure
 Inside Out
 The Invincible Piglet
 The Little Prince
 Marshall the Miracle Dog
 Minions
 My Little Pony: Equestria Girls – Friendship Games
 Oddball
 Ooops! Noah Is Gone...
 Paper Planes
 The Peanuts Movie
 Pokémon the Movie: Hoopa and the Clash of Ages
 Pororo: Cyberspace Adventure
 Scooby-Doo! and Kiss: Rock and Roll Mystery
 Scooby-Doo! Moon Monster Madness
 Shaun the Sheep Movie
 Snowtime!
 The SpongeBob Movie: Sponge Out of Water
 Strange Magic
 Tinker Bell and the Legend of the NeverBeast
 Tom and Jerry: Spy Quest
 Top Cat Begins
2016

 The Angry Birds Movie
 Dear Eleanor
 El Americano: The Movie
 Finding Dory
 Ice Age: Collision Course
 Kung Fu Panda 3
 The Land Before Time: Journey of the Brave
 Lego Scooby-Doo! Haunted Hollywood
 Middle School: The Worst Years of My Life
 Moana
 My Little Pony: Equestria Girls – Legend of Everfree
 Nine Lives
 Norm of the North
 Papa
 Ratchet & Clank
 Robinson Crusoe
 Rock Dog
 Scooby-Doo! and WWE: Curse of the Speed Demon
 The Secret Life of Pets
 Sheep and Wolves
 Sing
 Spark
 Storks
 Trolls
 Zootopia
2017

 Animal Crackers
 The Boss Baby
 Bunyan & Babe
 Cars 3
 Captain Underpants: The First Epic Movie
 Coco
 Despicable Me 3
 Diary of a Wimpy Kid: The Long Haul
 The Emoji Movie 
 Gnome Alone
 Hey Arnold!: The Jungle Movie
 The Jetsons & WWE: Robo-WrestleMania!
 The Lego Batman Movie
 The Lego Ninjago Movie
 Lego Scooby-Doo! Blowout Beach Bash
 Monster Trucks
 My Little Pony: The Movie
 The Nut Job 2: Nutty by Nature
 Paddington 2
 Scooby-Doo! Shaggy's Showdown
 Smurfs: The Lost Village
 The Star
2018

 Duck Duck Goose
 Goosebumps 2: Haunted Halloween
 Hotel Transylvania 3: Summer Vacation
 The House with a Clock in Its Walls
 Incredibles 2
 Mary Poppins Returns
 The Nutcracker and the Four Realms
 Peter Rabbit
 Ralph Breaks the Internet
 Scooby-Doo! & Batman: The Brave and the Bold
 Scooby-Doo! and the Gourmet Ghost
 Sherlock Gnomes
 Smallfoot
 Spider-Man: Into the Spider-Verse 
 Teen Titans Go! To the Movies
2019

 Abominable
 The Angry Birds Movie 2
 Arctic Dogs
 A Dog's Way Home
 Dora and the Lost City of Gold
 Frozen II
 The Haunted House: The Sky Goblin VS Jormungandr
 How to Train Your Dragon: The Hidden World
 The Kid Who Would Be King
 Klaus
 The Lego Movie 2: The Second Part
 Missing Link
 Playmobil: The Movie
 Pokémon Detective Pikachu
 Scooby-Doo! and the Curse of the 13th Ghost
 Scooby-Doo! Return to Zombie Island
 Toy Story 4
 The Secret Life of Pets 2
 A Shaun the Sheep Movie: Farmageddon
 Sheep and Wolves: Pig Deal
 Spies in Disguise
 Turma da Mônica: Laços
 UglyDolls
 Wonder Park

2020s

2020

 Artemis Fowl
 Cats & Dogs 3: Paws Unite!
 Dolittle
 Curious George: Go West, Go Wild
 The Croods: A New Age
 Happy Halloween, Scooby-Doo!
 Norm of the North: Family Vacation
 Onward
 The One and Only Ivan
 Over the Moon
 Phineas and Ferb the Movie: Candace Against the Universe
 Scoob!
 Soul
 The Secret Garden
 Sonic the Hedgehog
 The SpongeBob Movie: Sponge on the Run
 Timmy Failure: Mistakes Were Made
 Trolls World Tour
 We Bare Bears: The Movie
 The Willoughbys
 Wolfwalkers
2021

  Back to the Outback
  The Boss Baby: Family Business	
 Encanto
 Clifford the Big Red Dog
 Finding ʻOhana
 Flora & Ulysses
 Home Sweet Home Alone
 The Loud House Movie
 Luca
 The Mitchells vs. the Machines	
 My Little Pony: A New Generation
 PAW Patrol: The Movie
 Peter Rabbit 2: The Runaway
 Raya and the Last Dragon
 Ron's Gone Wrong
 Scooby-Doo! The Sword and the Scoob	
 Sing 2
 Space Jam: A New Legacy
 Spirit Untamed
 Straight Outta Nowhere: Scooby-Doo! Meets Courage the Cowardly Dog
 Tom and Jerry
 Vivo
 Wish Dragon
2022

 The Amazing Maurice
 The Bad Guys
 Better Nate Than Ever
 Chip 'n Dale: Rescue Rangers
 DC League of Super-Pets
 Hocus Pocus 2
 Hotel Transylvania: Transformania
 The Ice Age Adventures of Buck Wild
 Lightyear
 Lyle, Lyle, Crocodile
 Minions: The Rise of Gru
 My Father's Dragon
 Paws of Fury: The Legend of Hank
 Puss in Boots: The Last Wish
 The Sea Beast
 Sonic the Hedgehog 2
 Strange World
 Tom and Jerry: Cowboy Up!
 Trick or Treat Scooby-Doo!
 Turning Red
2023
 Are You There God? It's Me, Margaret
 Barbie
 Elemental
 Harold and the Purple Crayon
 Spider-Man: Across the Spider-Verse
 The Super Mario Bros. Movie
 Ruby Gillman, Teenage Kraken
 Wonka

See also
 Children's television series
 Children's literature

References

Children's